McLeay is a surname. Notable people with the surname include:

George McLeay (1892–1955), Australian politician
Glenn McLeay (born 1968), New Zealand cyclist
John McLeay Jr. (1922–2000), Australian politician
John McLeay Sr. (1893–1982), Australian politician
Leo McLeay (born 1945), Australian politician
Paul McLeay (born 1972), Australian politician

See also 
 Macleay (disambiguation)